Ceanothus cuneatus is a species of flowering shrub known by the common names buckbrush and wedgeleaf ceanothus.

Distribution
This Ceanothus is native to Oregon, California, and northern Baja California, where it can be found in a number of habitats, especially chaparral.

Description

Ceanothus cuneatus is a spreading bush, rounded to sprawling, reaching up to three meters in height. The evergreen leaves are stiff and somewhat tough and may be slightly toothed along the edges. The bush flowers abundantly in short, thick-stalked racemes bearing rounded bunches of tiny flowers, each about half a centimeter wide.

The fragrant flowers are white, sometimes tinted strongly with blue or lavender. The fruit is a round capsule with horns. It is about half a centimeter wide and contains three shiny dark seeds which are dispersed when the capsule explodes and propels them some distance. Harvester ants have been known to catch the seeds, which can lie dormant for a long time since fire is required for germination. This plant may be variable in appearance because it hybridizes easily with similar species.

While this shrub has a wide distribution in its range, certain varieties of the species are limited to small areas. The Monterey ceanothus (var. rigida), for example, is found only between the southern edge of the San Francisco Bay Area and San Luis Obispo County.

Ecology
It is a larval host to the California hairstreak, California tortoiseshell, ceanothus silkmoth, echo blue, hedgerow hairstreak, Pacuvius duskywing, western green hairstreak, and white-streaked saturnia moth.

References

External links
  Calflora Database: Ceanothus cuneatus (Buck brush,  Wedgeleaf ceanothus)
 Jepson Manual eFlora (TJM2) treatment of Ceanothus cuneatus
USDA Plants Profile for Ceanothus cuneatus (buckbrush)
USFS.gov: Ecology of Ceanothus cuneatus
UC Photos gallery of Ceanothus cuneatus (buckbrush)

cuneatus
Flora of California
Flora of Baja California
Flora of Oregon
Flora of the Cascade Range
Flora of the Klamath Mountains
Flora of the Sierra Nevada (United States)
Natural history of the California chaparral and woodlands
Natural history of the California Coast Ranges
Natural history of the Peninsular Ranges
Natural history of the San Francisco Bay Area
Natural history of the Santa Monica Mountains
Natural history of the Transverse Ranges
Plants described in 1838
Taxa named by Thomas Nuttall
Butterfly food plants
Flora without expected TNC conservation status